The Kurdish Philharmonic Orchestra is one of the few active classical music orchestra's in Iran, founded in 2005 by a group of musicians in the city of Sanandaj.

Introduction
The idea of establishing a Kurdish Philharmonic Orchestra was brought to life in 2005 by a group of musicians in Sanandaj. Kurdistan Philharmonic Orchestra is one of the most active collectives of the Kurdistan province, which has held several programs in Sanandaj during the past few years and organized the Fajr Music Festival. In addition to performing several live programs in recent months, the group has held specialized workshops and workshops with a number of Iranian and foreign artists.

Member's
Currently, the orchestra is directed by Mr. Mehdi Ahmadi ", the one of orchestra founder's. The Concertmaster Arsalan Kamkar and more than 50 musicians from classical music are members of the orchestra.

Board of directors
Bahman Moradnia Governor of Kurdistan Province (Legal member)
Hamid Reza Ardalan
Nader Mashayekhi
Hooshang Kamkar
Mohammad-Reza Darvishi
Mehdi Ahmadi (conductor)
Amin Moradi (Legal member)

Ex-members
Loris Tjeknavorian
Mohammad Reza Tafazzoli

References

Iranian orchestras
Kurdish music
Musical groups established in 2005
Kurdish musical groups